The Arboretum de Sant Guillem (Saint Guillaume in French, 8 hectares) is an arboretum located near the river Tech in Prats-de-Mollo-la-Preste (Pyrénées-Orientales, France). The arboretum was created in 1958 and contains about fifty varieties of conifers and deciduous trees, once a nursery for the Office National des Forêts but still well-marked, with hiking trails throughout.

See also 
 List of botanical gardens in France

References 
  Description on the site of L'écho des chênaies
 CityVox entry (French)

Saint Guillem, Arboretum de
Saint Guillem, Arboretum de